TPS or Turun Palloseura is an ice hockey team and 10-time champion of SM-liiga and 1-time champion of SM-sarja. They play in Turku, Finland, at Gatorade Center. In terms of championships, TPS is the second all-time most successful team in SM-Liiga, right behind Tappara.

Team history

TPS was established in 1922 as Turun Palloseura, from which the acronym derives. The club began ice hockey activities after 1929. Today, the full name of the company that owns the ice hockey team is HC TPS Turku Oy.

TPS has won the Finnish Championship in ice hockey 11 times: 1956, 1976, 1989, 1990, 1991, 1993, 1995, 1999, 2000, 2001, and 2010. Only Tampere teams Ilves and Tappara have won more titles when SM-sarja also counts. Coach Hannu Jortikka led the club to a total of six championships in 1989–91 and 1999–2001. TPS have also won two Finnish Cups, a European Cup in 1994, the European Hockey League in 1997, and a Super Cup in 1997.

Vladimir Yurzinov used to be the coach of TPS in 1992–98. The team is currently coached by Jussi Ahokas.

NHL players from TPS include Saku Koivu, Mikko Koivu, Miikka Kiprusoff, Sami Salo, Petteri Nummelin, Niko Kapanen, Jere Lehtinen, Rasmus Ristolainen, Antero Niittymäki, Lauri Korpikoski, Mikko Rantanen, Artturi Lehkonen, Matias Maccelli, Juraj Slafkovský, Kaapo Kakko, Juuso Pärssinen and others.

Honours

Finnish Champions
 SM-liiga, Kanada-malja (10): 1976, 1989, 1990, 1991, 1993, 1995, 1999, 2000, 2001, 2010
 SM-sarja (1): 1956

Runners-up
 SM-liiga (8): 1977, 1982, 1985, 1994, 1996, 1997, 2004, 2021, 2022
 SM-sarja (4): 1943, 1955, 1957, 1967
 SM-liiga (3): 1978, 1979, 1981
 SM-sarja (1): 1953

Finnish cup
 Finnish Cup (ice hockey) (2): 1955, 1956

European Cup
 IIHF European Cup (1): 1993

 European Hockey League (1): 1997

Players

Current roster

Staff
 Head Coach: Jussi Ahokas 
 Assistant Coach: Kari Kalto 
 Assistant Coach: Sami Salo 
 Goaltending Coach: Ari Moisanen 
 Physical Coach: Risto Rosendahl 
 Video Coach: Vesa Petäjä 
 Sporting Director: Rauli Urama

Honored numbers
3—Timo Nummelin
8—Juhani Wahlsten
11—Saku Koivu (not officially retired but out of circulation)
15—Reijo Leppänen 
16—Rauli Tammelin
23—Hannu Virta

Notable alumni

Antti Aalto
Peter Ahola
Mika Alatalo
Marko Anttila
Jim Bedard
Aki-Petteri Berg
Mal Davis
Miika Elomo
Mikko Eloranta
Atte Engren
Vjačeslavs Fanduļs
Ilari Filppula
Alexandar Georgiyev
Steve Graves
Tuomas Grönman
Mikko Haapakoski
Michael Holmqvist
Ivan Huml
Jani Hurme
Hannes Hyvönen
Kari Jalonen
Marko Jantunen
Martti Jarkko
Martti Järventie
Joonas Järvinen
Arto Javanainen
Chris Joseph
Olli Juolevi
Tomi Kallio
Niko Kapanen
Esa Keskinen
Markus Ketterer
Marko Kiprusoff
Miikka Kiprusoff
Tom Koivisto
Mikko Koivu
Saku Koivu
Lauri Korpikoski
Teemu Laine
Jere Lehtinen
Mika Lehtinen
Petteri Lehto
Antero Lehtonen
Reijo Leppänen
Seppo Lindström
Joni Lius
Jouni Loponen
Mikko Mäkelä
Kent McDonell
Tommi Miettinen
Reijo Mikkolainen
Tomáš Mojžíš
Antero Niittymäki
Petteri Nummelin
Timo Nummelin
Kai Nurminen
Lasse Pirjetä
Tomáš Plíhal
Jukka Porvari
Mikko Rantanen
Seppo Repo
Kimmo Rintanen
Craig Rivet
Alexander Salák
Peter Schaefer
Rob Shearer
Andrei Skopintsev
Karlis Skrastins
Aleksandr Smirnov
Raimo Summanen
Sami Salo
Kai Suikkanen
Niklas Sundblad
Seppo Suoraniemi
Toivo Suursoo
Oldřich Svoboda
Lee Sweatt
Henrik Tallinder
Juhani Tamminen
Jussi Timonen
Kimmo Timonen
German Titov
Pavel Torgayev
Viktor Tyumenev
Ville Vahalahti
Jorma Valtonen
Jarkko Varvio
Jukka Vilander
Hannu Virta
Tony Virta
Jukka Virtanen
Jiří Vykoukal
Juhani Wahlsten
Urpo Ylönen
Richard Žemlička

Seasonal history

Liiga individual awards

Best coach
 2010 Kai Suikkanen
 2001 Hannu Jortikka
 2000 Hannu Jortikka
 1999 Hannu Jortikka
 1995 Vladimir Yurzinov
 1994 Vladimir Yurzinov
 1993 Vladimir Yurzinov
 1991 Hannu Jortikka
 1990 Hannu Jortikka
 1989 Hannu Jortikka

SM-liiga Best player of the season, MVP 
As voted by the players.
 2001 Kimmo Rintanen
 2000 Kai Nurminen
 1997 Kimmo Rintanen
 1995 Saku Koivu
 1994 Esa Keskinen
 1992 Mikko Mäkelä
 1989 Jukka Vilander

Best goalie
 2010 Atte Engren
 1999 Miikka Kiprusoff
 1997 Jani Hurme
 1991 Markus Ketterer
 1989 Timo Lehkonen
 1980 Jorma Valtonen
 1979 Jorma Valtonen

Best defenceman
 2010 Lee Sweatt
 2001 Jouni Loponen
 1995 Petteri Nummelin
 1994 Petteri Nummelin
 1991 Hannu Virta
 1990 Hannu Virta
 1987 Hannu Virta

League top goalscorer
 2000 Kai Nurminen
 1994 Marko Jantunen
 1989 Jukka Vilander
 1988 Arto Javanainen
 1982 Reijo Leppänen

Most points in regular season
 2000 Kai Nurminen
 1995 Saku Koivu
 1994 Esa Keskinen
 1993 Esa Keskinen
 1992 Mikko Mäkelä
 1988 Esa Keskinen
 1982 Reijo Leppänen
 1981 Reijo LeppänenRookie of the Season
 2019 Kaapo Kakko
 2018 Petrus Palmu
 2007 Tuomas Suominen
 2000 Antero Niittymäki
 1996 Jani Hurme
 1982 Hannu Virta

Best plus/minus
 2017 Jasper Lindsten
 2001 Jouni Loponen
 2000 Kai Nurminen
 1997 Kimmo Timonen
 1994 Aleksandr Smirnov
 1990 Jukka Virtanen
 1989 Jukka Vilander
 1982 Timo Nummelin
 1980 Reijo Leppänen

 Regular season MVP 
Awarded by the league.
 2001 Tony Virta
 2000 Kai Nurminen
 1997 Jani Hurme
1995 Saku Koivu
 1994 Esa Keskinen

Gentleman player
 2012 Ville Vahalahti
 2001 Kimmo Rintanen
 2000 Kimmo Rintanen
 1999 Marko Kiprusoff
 1998 Kimmo Rintanen
 1997 Kimmo Rintanen
 1995 Jere Lehtinen
 1993 Esa Keskinen
 1989 Jukka Vilander
 1988 Jukka Vilander
 1987 Jukka Vilander
 1985 Reijo Leppänen
 1984 Esa Keskinen
 1981 Timo Nummelin
 1977 Jarmo Koivunen
 1957 Aki Salonen

Playoffs MVP
 2010 Ilari Filppula
 2000 Tomi Kallio
 1999 Miikka Kiprusoff
 1995 Saku Koivu

Former coaches

Vladimir Yurzinov
Jukka Koivu
Hannu Jortikka
Hannu Virta
Pekka Virta
Juha Pajuoja
Heikki Leime
Riku-Petteri Lehtonen
Juhani Tamminen
Kari Jalonen
Matti Keinonen
Juhani Wahlsten

See also
:Category:HC TPS players

References

External links
TPS official web site 
Official supporter club (not controlled by the club)
Independent TPS supporter club
Independent supporter club

 
Liiga 
Liiga teams
1922 establishments in Finland